Hong Bang Middle School was established in 1933 by French colonialists as a pension school for French children studying with local Vietnamese students in Hai Phong city. THCS Hong Bang (Hong Bang Middle School) has since become one of the oldest and most well-known public middle schools in Hai Phong city.

In addition to normal classes for all students, the school offers intensive classes specializing in the sciences, mathematics and foreign languages for students upon a rigorous competitive exam at their entrance to grade 6 (the start of middle school).

The school is known today for its long-tradition excellence in teaching and academics, as well as its historical architecture dated back to the French time.

References

1933 establishments in French Indochina
Schools in Ho Chi Minh City
Educational institutions established in 1933